= History of cricket in Kenya =

This article describes the history of Kenyan cricket.

== Historical background ==
Following initial colonisation by the Portuguese, Kenya gradually came under British influence in the latter part of the 19th century and in the first half of the 20th century. Cricket was probably introduced to the country in the 1880s.

== Early developments ==
The first match of note was "East African Protectorate v Rest of the World" (sic) at Mombasa in December 1899.

From 1910, a series of games called Officials v Settlers was established and ran until 1964.

In 1914, a Kenyan team crossed the border into Uganda and defeated their hosts by 5 wickets at Entebbe.

== External sources ==
- CricketArchive itinerary
